Agyneta nigripes is a species of sheet weaver found in Canada, Greenland and the Palearctic. It was described by Simon in 1884.

References

nigripes
Spiders described in 1884
Spiders of Canada
Invertebrates of Greenland
Palearctic spiders